The RagWing RW7 Duster is a single seat, low wing, strut-braced, single engine ultralight aircraft designed by Roger Mann and sold as plans by RagWing Aircraft Designs for amateur construction.

Design and development
The RW7 was designed as a homebuilt aircraft category design as it is too heavy to be a US FAR 103 Ultralight Vehicles compliant aircraft with that category's  empty weight limit. The RW7 was designed as a homebuilt version of a classic crop duster and in fact can be fitted with a small aerial application system. The aircraft was developed from the earlier RagWing RW4 Midwing Sport, which in turn was developed from the RagWing RW1 Ultra-Piet. All aircraft share common construction materials and methods.

The airframe is constructed entirely from wood and covered with aircraft fabric. The landing gear is of conventional configuration.

Partial kits and construction kits were available in the late 1990s, but today the aircraft is only offered as plans. Estimated construction time is 400–600 hours, although the designer estimates 400 hours. The aircraft can be built in a single car garage, with outdoor final assembly when the wings and fuselage are completed.

Specifications (RW7)

References

External links

1990s United States ultralight aircraft
Homebuilt aircraft